Sir Bradley Fried (born 12 August 1965) is a South African businessman. He is currently Chair of Goldman Sachs International. He is the Co-founder of Grovepoint Capital, prior to which he was chief executive of Investec Bank Plc, and previously served as chairman of the Court of the Bank of England.  He was previously also a non-executive board member of the Financial Conduct Authority.

Early life 
Fried was born in Cape Town, South Africa. He attended Westerford High School in Rondebosch, Cape Town from 1979 until his matriculation in 1983. He has a bachelor's degree in commerce, awarded with distinction, from the University of Cape Town. He was a Palmer Scholar at the Wharton School of the University of Pennsylvania, where he was awarded a master's degree in business administration (MBA) with distinction. He is also a qualified chartered accountant, having trained with Arthur Andersen in South Africa.

Career 
Fried was a partner at McKinsey & Company in New York, where he focused on strategy consulting to the financial services industry.

Fried joined Investec Bank in the UK in 1999, where he served as chief operating officer and chief executive. He subsequently served as a non-executive director of Investec Plc and Investec Limited between 2010 and 2016.

Fried co-founded Grovepoint Capital, a private equity firm, specialising in growth capital investments, in 2010.

Fried has served as a non-executive director of the Court of the Bank of England since June 2012, and served as Chair of Court from July 2018 to June 2022.

Fried chaired the Review Committee that examined the "Bank of England's approach to conflicts of interest." The report was released in August 2017.

Fried has been appointed Chair of Goldman Sachs International with effect from February 2023. 
 
He was knighted in the 2022 Birthday Honours for public service for his work with the Bank of England.

Personal life 
Fried is a Governor at the London Business School. He was a Fellow at Magdalene College, Cambridge, and was previously CEO-in-Residence of the Cambridge Judge Business School.

He is married to Lauren, with two sons, and lives in St. John's Wood.

References 

Living people
1965 births
British chief executives
Wharton School of the University of Pennsylvania alumni
Fellows of Magdalene College, Cambridge
University of Cape Town alumni
Knights Bachelor
South African emigrants to the United Kingdom